Santo Antônio dos Milagres (Portuguese meaning "Saint Anthony of the Miracles") is a municipality in the western part of the state of Piauí, Brazil. The population is 2,166 (2020 est.) in an area of 33.15 km².

Population history

References

External links
https://web.archive.org/web/20070203101758/http://www.citybrazil.com.br/pi/stoantoniomilagres/ 

Populated places established in 1995
Municipalities in Piauí